Chaleh Murt (also Romanized as Chāleh Mūrt) is a village in Kuh Shah Rural District, Ahmadi District, Hajjiabad County, Hormozgan Province, Iran. At the 2006 census, its population was 144, in 31 families.

References 

Populated places in Hajjiabad County